Alex Walmsley (born 10 April 1990) is an English professional rugby league footballer who plays as a  for St Helens in the Betfred Super League, and England and Great Britain at international level.

He previously played for the Batley Bulldogs in the Championship and has spent time on loan from Saints at his former club in the second tier.

Background
Walmsley was born in Dewsbury, West Yorkshire, England.

Club career
Walmsley started his career in the amateur leagues, playing for Dewsbury Celtic, and his university team, Leeds Met Carnegie. In 2011, he received the National Conference League player of the year award.

In February 2012, Walmsley signed for Batley following a spell on trial at the club. He won Batley's player of the year award and the Championship Young Player of the Year during his only season with the club, before signing with St Helens for the start of the 2013 season.

Walmsley briefly returned to Batley at the start of 2013 on a dual registration before establishing himself in the St Helens first team that season.

St Helens reached the 2014 Super League Grand Final, and Walmsley was selected to play from the interchange bench in their 14–6 victory over the Wigan Warriors at Old Trafford.

Walmsley's form in 2015 saw him named to the Super League Dream Team for the first time as well as earning him a nomination for the Man of Steel award.

He played in the 2019 Challenge Cup Final defeat by the Warrington Wolves at Wembley Stadium.

He played in the 2019 Super League Grand Final victory over the Salford Red Devils at Old Trafford.

Walmsley played in St Helens 8-4 2020 Super League Grand Final victory over Wigan at the Kingston Communications Stadium in Hull.

On 17 July 2021, he played for St. Helens in their 26-12 2021 Challenge Cup Final victory over Castleford.
On 9 October 2021, he played for St. Helens in their 2021 Super League Grand Final victory over Catalans Dragons.  It was the club's third successive championship victory in a row.
On 13 September 2022, Walmsley was ruled out for the remainder of the 2022 Super League season and the World Cup with a foot injury.
On 18 February 2023, Walmsley played in St Helens 13-12 upset victory over Penrith in the 2023 World Club Challenge.
In round 2 of the 2023 Super League season, Walmsley scored two tries for St Helens in a 24-6 victory over Castleford.

International career
Walmsley was a member of the England team which played in the 2017 Rugby League World Cup. In the final against Australia, Walmsley came off the bench in England's 6–0 defeat.

He was selected in squad for the 2019 Great Britain Lions tour of the Southern Hemisphere. He made his Great Britain test debut in the defeat by Tonga.

References

External links

St Helens profile
SL profile
Saints Heritage Society profile
Statistics at rlwc2017.com

1990 births
Living people
Batley Bulldogs players
England national rugby league team players
English rugby league players
Great Britain national rugby league team players
Rugby league players from Dewsbury
Rugby league props
St Helens R.F.C. players